Lomov (from lom = crowbar) is a Slavic male surname. Its feminine counterpart is Lomova. It may refer to:

Nicolai Lomov (1946–2020), Russian classical pianist
 Yury Lomov (born 1964), Olympic shooter from Kyrgyzstan
Lucie Lomová (born 1964), Czech comics author
Nadezda Lomova (born 1991), Russian weightlifter

See also
Nizhny Lomov, town in Russia

Russian-language surnames